Aloe is an unincorporated community in Victoria County, Texas, United States. The community was established in 1889, when the Gulf, Western Texas & Pacific Railroad built a line through the area; it was named for the abundance of local yucca plants. Aloe Army Airfield opened in the community during World War II; after the war, it operated as Victoria County Airport until 1960.

References

Unincorporated communities in Victoria County, Texas
Unincorporated communities in Texas